John Brenner (born January 4, 1961) is a retired shot putter from the United States. He was the 1986 and 1987 United States champion in the shot put.

Brenner competed collegiately for UCLA.  He won the 1984 NCAA Championship in both the shot put and the discus throw.  That year he set the collegiate championship record in the shot put at  that lasted 11 years until it was surpassed by John Godina, also from UCLA, which is the current record.

References

 Profile
 1984 Year Ranking

1961 births
Living people
American male discus throwers
American male shot putters
Place of birth missing (living people)
UCLA Bruins men's track and field athletes
World Athletics Championships medalists
Track and field athletes from California
Goodwill Games medalists in athletics
Competitors at the 1986 Goodwill Games
20th-century American people